Štěpán Matek (born 14 May 1987) is a Czech politician and  former deputy chairman of the Christian and Democratic Union – Czechoslovak People's Party (KDU-ČSL). 

In 2016–2018 he worked as sales manager in Jablotron Company. In 2018 he was elected deputy mayor of Jablonec nad Nisou. In 2019 he was elected as deputy leader in 2019 Christian and Democratic Union – Czechoslovak People's Party leadership election.

References 

1987 births
KDU-ČSL politicians
Living people
People from Jablonec nad Nisou
Technical University of Liberec alumni